05 Fuck Em is a mixtape by American rapper Lil B. It was independently released on December 24, 2013, through Lil B's own record label, BasedWorld Records. Intended to be spread across six discs, the mixtape is  the longest mixtape release by Lil B which is not a compilation - longer compilation mixtapes include the 676-track Free Music: The Complete MySpace Collection (2011) and 855 Song Based Freestyle Mixtape (2012). The mixtape verges on nearly six hours with 101 tracks.

Background and music
The mixtape adopts eclectic production styles and further explores the music genres that Lil B experimented with in his career, including cloud rap, hyphy, trap and rap rock. The mixtape also features use of various samples. At least four tracks use samples from The Diplomats album, Diplomatic Immunity and the track "Lil B" uses the beat from LL Cool J's 1999 FUBU commercial song "Fatty Girl." The track, "Im the Rap God", features Lil B rapping over the instrumental version of System of a Down's 2001 song, "Toxicity", which was described as  "a drunken-style karaoke freestyle" and "your friend's blunt-smoking roommate doing an impression of MC Ride on the choruses." The track, "G.O.R. (God of Rap)" lasts for ten minutes and starts with a sample from 1991 film Barton Fink, accompanied by  atmospheric guitar and drum beat, before evolving into a sample by symphonic metal band Nightwish. "Twurk Sum" contains an interpolation of "Homelife is a Drag" by punk band No-Cash. The song "Im Gunna Be a Doctor" uses a sample from Twista's 2003 song, "Slow Jamz", which was produced by Kanye West.

Production on the album was handled by a range of people, including longtime collaborators like Keyboard Kid & Lou Pocus, as well as up and comers such as Drip-133, DO$AGE, Neros Beats & Joshrefe. The mixtape even features a track produced by Larry Fisherman aka Mac Miller.

The lyrics of the song range from confessionals, free associations, motivational speeches, and uncensored sex talk. The themes include brooding, anger at the prison industrial complex, and emotional conflicts.

Critical reception

The album generally received mixed to positive reviews from music critics. Consequence of Sound reviewer Pat Levy described the album as "complete and complex piece of work that Lil B has produced to date" and wrote that it "showcases his ability to maneuver his persona over a number of different production styles." Nevertheless, he also stated: "Maybe his 'Control Response' is far-fetched for his talents, but it's not like he's struggling for relevance." Christopher R. Weingarten of Rolling Stone described the album as "his grandest gesture yet." He commented that "the mixtape reaches the highest highs of the best Lil B songs," while criticizing the "id-fueled" sexual fantasies, which he thought "end up stealing the spotlight from an album that's at its best when showing its sensitive core."

Track listing
 "Intro" – 3:15
 "Welcome To 05" – 2:38
 "4 My" – 3:34
 "So Thirsty" – 4:23
 "Strip You" – 3:06
 "Lil B" – 6:15
 "Liii" – 3:08
 "Twurk Sum" – 2:52
 "Lil B's Layer" – 3:05
 "Goin' Platinum" – 1:54
 "No Mo Blow" – 3:46	 1.780
 "G.O.R. (God of Rap)" – 10:19
 "Simple Math" – 2:54
 "You Unda" – 4:01
 "Prayin 4 a Brick" – 4:24
 "Free Da Wurld" – 4:38
 "I Am The Rawest Rapper" – 2:46
 "R.I.P Kennedy" – 4:23
 "Smack" – 2:23
 "Licks and Ducktape" – 2:44
 "Strong Arm" – 3:51
 "Love B" – 3:06
 "Blow" – 3:07
 "Lanlord" – 4:01
 "Switch Lanes" – 3:24
 "Rock Up 4sho" – 3:21
 "New York Anthem" – 3:44
 "People Like Me" – 4:14	
 "Rob The Jeweler" – 4:26
 "Gutta Work" – 3:23	
 "Free Bandz" – 3:09
 "Insurance" – 2:32
 "BGYCFMB" – 3:20
 "Lick A Shot" – 3:36
 "Bitch KT" – 3:31
 "Ellen Degeneres Remix" – 4:05
 "10k Summa" – 2:38
 "1 Night In Florida" – 3:16
 "FMBN" – 3:30
 "Im The Rap God" – 3:35
 "Ruff Ryder" – 1:33
 "Stright Up" – 3:30
 "Amis Scur" – 1:06
 "Mount Up" – 1:57
 "Act Right" – 3:47
 "Built To Survive" – 3:47	
 "Dear Mama" – 2:51	
 "I'm Gunna Be A Doctor" – 2:59
 "Bloggers Anthem" – 2:55	 
 "Gutta Goin' Platinum" – 5:01	 
 "Beat The Ho Up" – 3:00	 
 "Stop Selling Dope" – 3:02	 
 "Motivation Remix" – 2:41	 
 "Painful Intermission" – 3:43	 
 "1 Mo" – 2:57
 "Stressful" – 4:16
 "U C Me" – 2:17
 "Hummus Or Crack" – 3:21	
 "Hardest To Do It" – 3:32	
 "05 Fuck 'em" – 2:35	
 "Control Response" – 3:13	 
 "Is This Life" – 3:36
 "So Posh" – 3:34
 "Buy A Ho" – 2:46
 "Cought A Case" – 3:41
 "Let 'Em Go B" – 3:41	 
 "Cocaine Option" – 4:11	
 "Do da BasedGod" – 2:45
 "Wolfpack Foreva" – 3:19
 "Do It Like Bluit" – 2:14
 "I Need" – 2:09	
 "Kurt Angle" – 4:04	
 "My Garage (Remix) ft. Salty" – 4:33	 
 "I Own Swag Remix" – 3:25	 
 "Quit Stealing Swag" – 3:54	
 "Last Dance (remix) ft. Cashout Clete" – 3:41	 
 "Texas Or " – 3:02	
 "Servin' Rocks" – 4:06	
 "Gotta Pay Me" – 3:15	 
 "Pixar" – 2:20	 
 "Snitch" – 4:18	
 "Waddup" – 2:30	
 "Bar Mitzvah" – 3:21	 
 "Dying Breed" – 3:18	
 "Welcome Home" – 3:07	
 "Based News" – 3:09	
 "Before the Diary" – 1:31	
 "Block Report" – 3:25	 
 "To The Sky" – 3:38	 
 "We Did It" – 3:32	 
 "We Still Winnin'" – 4:02	
 "HB" – 2:57	 
 "Look In My Eyes" – 2:41	 
 "Dope Lines" – 4:01	
 "Yee" – 3:51
 "I'm So Hood" – 2:21
 "Stealing From Strippers" – 5:47	
 "From The Bay" – 3:33
 "4 My (Clean Radio Edit)" – 3:33
 "Hadouken (based freestyle)" ft. Keke the Adopted Tabby Cat" – 4:28	
 "05 Out" – 4:32

Production credits 
Tracks 1, 68 & 101 produced by Keyboard Kid.

Track 2 produced by DA Honorable C.N.O.T.E

Track 3 produced by Puablo Stay Trippin

Track 4 produced by ISSUE

Track 8 produced by King Christian

Track 11 produced by Gord Z

Track 12 (First Part) produced by Trah & Karmaeiic

Tracks 12 (Second Part) & 53 produced by Neros Beats

Tracks 13 & 72 produced by Iced Out

Track 14 produced by Na'Listen

Track 17 produced by $Sounds$

Track 22 produced by Na'Listen

Tracks 25 & 67 produced by t.a.

Track 29 produced by Chris High

Track 31 produced by AraabMuzik

Track 32 produced by Trill Spector

Track 33 produced by JGramm Beats ("Upper Echelon" by Travis Scott)

Track 34 produced by The Legacy

Track 35 produced by Lil Fireworkz

Tracks 38 & 82 produced by DO$AGE

Track 46 produced by Huey Daze

Track 47 produced by LBF

Track 48 produced by Kanye West ("Slow Jamz" by Kanye West & Twista)

Track 54 produced by The Cuts Crew

Track 55 produced by Drip-133

Track 58 produced by Tazmanian Tiger

Track 59 produced by Lil Zen

Track 60 produced by Harlem Sekani

Track 63 produced by Gord Z

Track 69 produced by Kanye West ("Dip-Set Forever" by Cam'ron)

Track 72 produced by Joshrefe

Track 73 produced by Zaytoven

Track 74 produced by Hum Beats

Track 76 produced by Knucklehead

Track 79 produced by Swimful Butterfly

Track 80 produced by Larry Fisherman aka Mac Miller

Track 81 produced by Marl Borough

Track 83 produced by Korda Beats

Track 84 produced by Ty-Tracks ("Harlem Streets" by Cam'ron)

Track 85 produced by Kaine Solo

Tracks 87 & 94 produced by Lou Pocus

Track 89 produced by Kanye West ("Dreams" by Game)

Track 91 produced by Snapy Dee

Track 93 produced by DJ Devastator ("Where Was Heaven" by Wu-Syndicate)

Track 95 produced by Notmine

Track 97 produced by G5 Kidz

Track 100 produced by Madison Carter

References

External links
 05 Fuck Em on DatPiff

2013 mixtape albums
Lil B albums
Self-released albums
Albums free for download by copyright owner
Albums produced by Mac Miller
Albums produced by Honorable C.N.O.T.E.
Lo-fi music albums